"Loca" is a 2020 single by Indian rapper Yo Yo Honey Singh featuring Simar Kaur. The track was released on 3 March 2020 by T-Series via YouTube. The video stars Yo Yo Honey Singh and Nickky Pickky. It has a Latin American (reggaeton) beat.

Reception 
The music video was produced by Bhushan Kumar of T-Series and co-produced by Bobby Suri and Yo Yo Honey Singh. Within 24 hours of its release, it had garnered over 18 million views. As of 24 January 2021, it has gained over 173 Million views on YouTube with over 2.7 million likes.

References 

2020 songs
Yo Yo Honey Singh songs
Hindi-language songs